The Qatari Women Association is made up of Qatari citizens only, they pose in media projects that either be religious or social. Some of the projects reached the worldwide repercussions such as "Reflect your respect" which was launched in the "Fox News Channel" on the red-eye program.

Objectives 
The association is aimed at promoting the role of women in the Qatari society and the protection of national identity it, also calls for decency and Islamic values and also the Islamic Dawa.

References

External links 
 

Women's organisations based in Qatar